Abdoul Nasser Adamou Garba (born 23 December 1991) is a Nigerien professional footballer who plays as a defender for Douanes. He was a squad member for the 2020 African Nations Championship.

References

1991 births
Living people
Nigerien footballers
Niger international footballers
AS Douanes (Niger) players
AS FAN players
Association football defenders
Niger A' international footballers
2020 African Nations Championship players